Westgate Center (or Westgate Shopping Center) is a  regional shopping center located in the West San Jose neighborhood of San Jose, California. The mall is located at the intersection of Saratoga Avenue and Campbell Avenue. Current major anchor tenants include Burlington Coat Factory, Nordstrom Rack, Ross Dress for Less, TJ Maxx, and Target, along with Michael's, Old Navy, Gap Factory Store, and Nike Factory Store.

Ownership
The current owners are Federal Realty Investment Trust, who also own Santana Row and Old Town Center in Los Gatos.

Facilities
Westgate Center, located in San Jose, California is a 645,000 square foot center. While many of the larger stores have their own exterior entrances, there is an interior mall corridor housing smaller stores like Sketchers, Torrid, and Carter's, along with a small food court.

Stores
Stores at the mall include J. Crew, Ross Dress For Less, Nordstrom Rack, Target, Old Navy, Any Mountain, Michael's, Nike Factory Store, Party City, TJ Maxx, Walmart Neighborhood Market, Mattress Firm, Burlington Coat Factory, Ella, GAP, Torrid, Men's Wearhouse, and Tuxedo Warehouse.
The mall previously hosted a Montgomery Ward's where the Target store is now located. Barnes & Noble, until it closed in 2013, was one of 16 stores closed that year. This location is now a Nike Factory Store. Also previously in the complex were Storables, Blockbuster Video, Safeway, Montgomery Ward, and JCPenney. Century Theatres also had one of its domes, Century 25, on the complex at the corner of Saratoga Avenue and Campbell Avenue, before it was sold to an independent group who renamed it the Retro Dome. The group eventually moved and the dome was demolished, replaced by the Veggie Grill.

References
Article on the $97M 2002 sale

External links

 Westgate Center Official Website

Buildings and structures in San Jose, California
Shopping malls established in 1960
Shopping malls in the San Francisco Bay Area
Economy of San Jose, California
Shopping malls in Santa Clara County, California